Ricardo Gomes Xavier (born July 22, 1978 in Bonito, Mato Grosso do Sul) is a Brazilian football forward.

Career
Played for Náutico.

Career statistics
(Correct )

Contract
 Guarani.

References

External links
 Ricardo Xavier at oGol 
 
 

1978 births
Living people
Brazilian footballers
Brazilian expatriate footballers
Criciúma Esporte Clube players
União São João Esporte Clube players
Guarani FC players
Clube Náutico Capibaribe players
FC Spartak Vladikavkaz players
Associação Desportiva São Caetano players
Expatriate footballers in Russia
Sportspeople from Mato Grosso do Sul
Clube Atlético Sorocaba players
Association football forwards